Synpolydactyly is a joint presentation of syndactyly (fusion of digits) and polydactyly (production of supernumerary digits). This is often a result of a mutation in the HOX D13 gene.


Types

References

External links 

Congenital disorders of musculoskeletal system
Transcription factor deficiencies